Arissou Traorè (born 31 December 1984) is a Togolese semi-professional footballer who plays as a forward for ASD Chiampo.

Traorè made one FIFA unofficial appearance for the Togo national team.

References

External links

POINTBLOG
Castelgomberto Web Site

1984 births
People from Sokodé
Living people
Togolese footballers
Association football forwards
Togo international footballers
AC Semassi FC players
Togolese expatriate footballers
Togolese expatriate sportspeople in Italy
Expatriate footballers in Italy
21st-century Togolese people